The War Commemorative Medal was a commemorative medal established in 1933 by the First Republic of Austria. The medal was awarded to Austria's military participants in World War I.

Appearance
The obverse of the medal depicts a right facing eagle surmounting the escutcheon with fess depicting the simplified arms of Austria. Below the eagle is the inscription FÜR ÖSTERREICH. The reverse of the medal bears the inscription 1914-1918 surrounded by a wreath of oak leaves around the edge.

Combatants could wear crossed gilt swords on the ribbon.

References

Weblinks

Military awards and decorations of Austria
Awards established in 1933
Campaign medals
Military awards and decorations of World War I